Rosi Manger is a Swiss curler and World Champion. She won a gold medal at the 1979 World Curling Championships.

Teammates

References

Living people
Swiss female curlers
World curling champions
Year of birth missing (living people)
European curling champions